Sustainuance was an English-language business magazine that was published monthly in India by Saaga Interactive Pte Ltd.  Its focus was on the sustainability industry. The name is a combination of the words "Sustain" and "Nuance".

The founding team included Sameer Gore (Executive Director & Publisher) & Uday Surve (Chairman).

Sustainuance magazine was first published in August 2012. However, owing to financial reasons, the magazine was closed down in 2014.

Saaga Interactive
Founded in 2012, Saaga Interactive expanded into realty and publishing. It comprised two divisions: Saaga Infra Projects Lts and Ananya Resorts and Residences Ltd.

References

2012 establishments in Maharashtra
2014 disestablishments in India
Defunct magazines published in India
Business magazines published in India
English-language magazines published in India
Magazines established in 2012
Magazines disestablished in 2014
Monthly magazines published in India
Mass media in Mumbai